The Man in the Dark is a 1930 German thriller film directed by Edmund Heuberger and starring Carl Auen, Edith Meinhard, and Siegfried Berisch. It was made as the sequel to the 1929 film Lux, King of Criminals.

The film's sets were designed by the art director Gustav A. Knauer and Willy Schiller.

Cast

References

Bibliography

External links

1930 films
1930s thriller films
German thriller films
Films of the Weimar Republic
German silent feature films
Films directed by Edmund Heuberger
German sequel films
German black-and-white films
Silent thriller films
1930s German films